The men's pole vault event  at the 1987 European Athletics Indoor Championships was held on 22 February.

Results

References

Pole vault at the European Athletics Indoor Championships
Pole